Witness for the Defense is a 1983 role-playing game adventure for Star Trek: The Role Playing Game published by FASA.

Contents
Witness for the Defense is FASA's second published adventure for Star Trek: The Role Playing Game and features the Horta from the episode "The Devil in the Dark".

Reception
William A. Barton reviewed Witness for the Defense in Space Gamer No. 70. Barton commented that "Witness For The Defense is a well-constructed adventure for ST:RPG and should provide a satisfying session of play for a crew of Star Fleet players - especially those who particularly enjoyed the Horta episode of the old series."

Reviews
Different Worlds #36 (Sept./Oct., 1984)

References

Role-playing game supplements introduced in 1983
Star Trek: The Role Playing Game adventures